Kalpakian (or Kalpakyan) is a surname of Armenian origin. Notable people with the surname include:

Arda Kalpakian (born 1944), Lebanese Olympic athlete
Laura Kalpakian (born 1945), American author
Sebouh Kalpakian (born ?), Lebanese Armenian politician
Sirvart Kalpakyan Karamanuk (1912–2008), Armenian composer, pianist

Armenian-language surnames